Andrea Luci (born 30 March 1985) is an Italian footballer who plays as a midfielder for Livorno.

Club career
After his time with the Fiorentina and Juventus youth systems, Luci was loaned out to Sassari Torres 1903 for the 2005–06 season. He was then loaned out to Pescara Calcio, for the 2006–07 Serie B season. After Pescara's relegation to Serie C1, Andrea Luci was again farmed to Serie B side Ascoli Calcio 1898 in a joint-ownership bid. In June 2008 Ascoli bought Luci's remaining 50% rights for €103,000.

In September 2009 Luci signed a new 4-year contract with the club.

On 25 June 2010, a few days before the closure of the 2009–10 financial year, he was sold to fellow Serie B club Livorno.

On 24 September 2020 he signed with Carrarese. On 23 December 2021, his contract with Carrarese was terminated by mutual consent.

On 29 December 2021, he returned to Livorno, now re-organized in the fifth-tier Eccellenza.

References

External links
 AIC.Football.it Profile 
 Lega Serie B Profile 

1985 births
Living people
Italian footballers
Serie A players
Serie B players
Serie C players
Juventus F.C. players
Delfino Pescara 1936 players
Ascoli Calcio 1898 F.C. players
U.S. Livorno 1915 players
Sportspeople from the Province of Livorno
Association football midfielders
S.E.F. Torres 1903 players
Carrarese Calcio players
Footballers from Tuscany
People from Piombino